Grypomyia is a genus of flies in the family Stratiomyidae.

Species
Grypomyia gracilis Kertész, 1923

References

Stratiomyidae
Brachycera genera
Taxa named by Kálmán Kertész
Diptera of South America